Natural Language Semantics is a quarterly peer-reviewed academic journal of semantics published by Springer Science+Business Media. It covers semantics and its interfaces in grammar, especially in syntax. The founding editors-in-chief were Irene Heim (MIT) and Angelika Kratzer (University of Massachusetts Amherst). The current editor-in-chief is Amy Rose Deal (University of California, Berkeley).

Abstracting and indexing  
The journal is abstracted and indexed in:

According to the Journal Citation Reports, the journal has a 2012 impact factor of 0.480.

References

External links 
 

Semantics journals
Springer Science+Business Media academic journals
English-language journals
Quarterly journals
Publications established in 1993